The 407th Support Brigade (407th AFSB) is a support brigade of the United States Army.

External links
407th Support Brigade at the Institute of Heraldry

Support 407